Wyoming Highway 96 (WYO 96) is a  east–west Wyoming State Road located in south-central Converse County west of Douglas.

Route description
Wyoming Highway 96 begins its western end at exit 146 of Interstate 25 and Converse County Route 30 (Cherokee Trail). WYO 96 runs south  and turns east and travels south of and parallel to Interstate 25. Wyoming Highway 96 is not signed for exit 146, although it is signed as La Prele Road. Highway 96 eventually veers south away from I-25 and heads southeasterly until it reaches Wyoming Highway 91 west of Douglas at 3.11 miles where the highway ends.

Major intersections

References

Official 2003 State Highway Map of Wyoming

External links 

Wyoming State Routes 000-099
WYO 96 - I-25/US 20/US 26/US 87 to WYO 91

Transportation in Converse County, Wyoming
096